Uduc is a town located in the South West of Western Australia between Harvey and the Indian Ocean coast at Myalup. It is an agricultural district and was first settled by William Crampton between 1844 and 1860.

References

Towns in Western Australia
Shire of Harvey